Little Altars Everywhere is a 1992 short story collection by Rebecca Wells which chronicles the adventures of the Ya-Ya Sisterhood—four eccentric women—and their children, affectionately called the Petites Ya-Yas.

Plot introduction
Author Rebecca Wells alternates between setting her short stories in the 1960s, when Siddalee Walker, daughter of Vivi, is growing up, and the early 1990s, when Sidda is grown and dealing with the consequences of her turbulent childhood. It is the prequel to the 1996 novel Divine Secrets of the Ya-Ya Sisterhood. Each chapter is narrated by a different person (Little Shep, Sidda, Lulu, etc.).

1998 short story collections
American short story collections
HarperCollins books